Sir Frederick John Owen Evans  (9 March 1815 – 20 December 1885), was an officer of the Royal Navy. He became a distinguished hydrographer during his career and served as Hydrographer of the Navy.

Biography
Evans, son of John Evans, a master in the Royal Navy, was born on 9 March 1815. He entered the navy as a second-class volunteer in 1828. Joseph Jukes, the geologist, was on board the Fly, and wrote an account of the expedition.

During the Crimean War he served in the Baltic Sea, receiving the special thanks of Sir Charles Napier for his share in piloting the fleet through Åland.

By this time Evans had become known for his scientific abilities, and in particular for his work on magnetism. He understood the need for studies of the effects of magnetic materials on ships' compasses at a period when the Navy was being revolutionised by the shift from wooden to iron construction. He had already done considerable work on this problem in the years between 1842 and 1851. In 1855 he was appointed superintendent of the compass department of the navy, and was able to devote himself entirely to the problems of the use of the magnetic compass in iron ships and armour-clads. Evans, in co-operation with Archibald Smith, accomplished the task satisfactorily. He contributed five papers, all dealing with the magnetism of ships, to the Philosophical Transactions of the Royal Society, of which he was elected a fellow in 1862.

Evans was commissioned a staff-commander in 1863, staff-captain in 1867, and full captain in 1872. In 1865 he was appointed Chief Assistant to the Hydrographer to the Admiralty, Captain George Henry Richards, while continuing to the head of the magnetic department. In 1874 he succeeded Richards as Hydrographer, a post he held until 1884. In this position he was responsible for the charts, pilot guides and other publications of the Admiralty.

He was invested as a Companion of the Order of the Bath in May 1873, and promoted to Knight Commander of the same order in the 1881 Birthday Honours. He was vice-president of the Royal Geographical Society from 1879 to 1881, and president of the geographical section of the British Association in 1876. After resigning the post of hydrographer, Evans was appointed one of the British delegates to the International Meridian Conference held at Washington, D.C. in 1885, to fix a prime meridian and universal day.

He died at his residence, 21 Dawson Place, Pembridge Square, London, on 20 December 1885. He had married, on 12 November 1846, Elizabeth Mary, eldest daughter of Captain Charles Hall, R.N., of Plymouth.

Published work

This went through a number of editions, the fourth appearing in 1875. In 1858 Evans prepared a 'Chart of Curves of Equal Magnetic Variation,’ which was published by the Admiralty. In 1860 he wrote a valuable 'Report on Compass Deviations in the Royal Navy'. His most important work was the 'Admiralty Manual for Deviations of the Compass,’ of which Smith and himself were joint editors (1st ed. 1862, 2nd ed. 1863, 3rd ed. 1869). A simple account of the same subject was issued by Evans in 1870 as an 'Elementary Manual for Deviations of the Compass.' These have become standard textbooks, having been translated and adopted by all the great maritime nations.

His published work in the Philosophical Transactions of the Royal Society appeared between 1860–1872. Subsequently, Evans devoted much attention to terrestrial magnetism. He compiled the magnetical instructions for the observers on board  in 1872, and delivered a lecture on the 'Magnetism of the Earth' to the Royal Geographical Society in 1878. In 1881 he contributed a paper to the British Association on 'Oceanic or Maritime Discovery from 1831 to 1881.'

Commemoration

While undertaking the survey on the Acheron, Evans pointed out the pass that now connects Sumner and Lyttelton. This pass is now known as Tapuwaeharuru / Evans Pass. Nearby, on Banks Peninsula, Mount Evans is also named after Evans. In Kaikiekie / Bradshaw Sound in Fiordland, it is likely that Evans Head is named after Evans.

List of publications

Philosophical Transactions of the Royal Society

Other Publications
 . Full text of the fourth edition (1875) available at The Internet Archive

References

External links 
 

1815 births
1885 deaths
English hydrographers
Fellows of the Royal Society
Hydrographers of the Royal Navy
Knights Commander of the Order of the Bath
Royal Navy officers
Royal Navy personnel of the Crimean War